Fiskerlivets farer (The Dangers in a Fisherman's Life) is a 1907 Norwegian film directed by Julius Jaenzon.  Running between seven and eight minutes, it was the first film produced in Norway.

The original film is lost. A reconstructed version was filmed in 1954.

References

External links 
 

1907 films
Lost Norwegian films
Norwegian silent short films
Norwegian black-and-white films
1900s lost films
1907 short films